The 1969 Oklahoma Sooners football team represented the University of Oklahoma in the 1969 NCAA University Division football season. It was the 75th season for the Sooners.

Schedule

Roster

Game summaries

Oklahoma State (Bedlam Series)

    
    
    
    
    
    
 
    

Steve Owens rushed for a career-high 261 yards and broke the single season Big Eight touchdown record set by Nebraska's Bobby Reynolds in 1950.

Awards and honors
Steve Owens, Heisman Trophy
Steve Owens, Walter Camp Award

Rankings

NFL draft
The following players were drafted into the National Football League following the season.

References

Oklahoma
Oklahoma Sooners football seasons
Oklahoma Sooners football